Tibovirus is a term often used to describe viruses that are transmitted by tick vectors. The word tibovirus is an acronym (TIck-BOrne virus). This falls within the superorder arthropod thus tibovirus is classified under Arthropod Borne virus (Arborvirus). For a person to acquire infection the tick must bite and feed for a sufficient period of time. The tiboviruses that affect humans are limited to within 3 families: Flaviviridae, Reoviridae, and Bunyaviridae.

Flaviviridae:
 Virus: Tick-borne meningoencephalitis virus
 Disease: Tick-borne meningoencephalitis
 Vector: deer tick (Ixodes scapularis), Ixodes ricinus (Europe), Ixodes persulcatus (Russia + Asia))
 Region: Europe and Northern Asia

Reoviridae:
 Virus: Colorado tick fever virus
 Disease: Colorado tick fever
 Vector: Dermacentor andersoni
 Region: US (West)

Bunyaviridae:
 Virus: Crimean-Congo hemorrhagic fever virus
 Disease: Crimean-Congo hemorrhagic fever
 Vector: Hyalomma marginatum, Rhipicephalus bursa
 Region: Southern part of Asia, Northern Africa, Southern Europe

 Virus: Heartland virus
 Disease: Severe Febrile Illness
 Vector: Lone Star Tick (Amblyomma americanum)
 Region: Missouri and Tennessee, United States

References

Viruses